Berulava is a Georgian surname. Notable people with the surname include:
Alexander Berulava (1945–1993), Georgian journalist, writer, and human rights activist
Gennadi Berulava (1942–2013), Abkhaz politician
Luka Berulava (born 2002), Georgian pair skater
Mikhail Berulava (born 1950), Russian scientist and politician

Surnames of Georgian origin
Georgian-language surnames
Surnames of Abkhazian origin